Chevreul's salt (copper(I,II) sulfite dihydrate, Cu2SO3•CuSO3•2H2O or Cu3(SO3)2•2H2O), is a copper salt which was prepared for the first time by a French chemist Michel Eugène Chevreul in 1812. Its unusual property is that it contains copper in both of its common oxidation states. It is insoluble in water and stable in air. What was known as Rogojski's salt is a mixture of Chevreul's salt and metallic copper.

Preparation
Chevreul's salt is prepared by treating aqueous copper(II) sulfate with a solution of potassium metabisulfite. The solution changes colour from blue to green immediately. The identity of the green species is unknown. Heating this solution produces a reddish solid precipitate:

3 CuSO4 + 4 K2S2O5 + 3 H2O → Cu3(SO3)2•2H2O + 4 K2SO4 + 4 SO2 + H2SO4

When sodium ions are present in the solutions that form the salt, sodium can substitute for some of the copper (I), as the ions have the same charge and similar sizes.

Reactions

Chevreul's salt exhibits properties of both copper(I) and copper(II). Hydrochloric acid produces a white solid of copper(I) chloride. If too much acid is added, the precipitate dissolves. If an ammonia solution is added to the product, it is dissolved and a deep blue color appears - the presence of [Cu(NH3)4]2+ complex.

On heating in an inert atmosphere it is stable to 200 °C.  It gives off water and sulfur dioxide to give CuSO4•Cu2O and CuSO4•2CuO. At 850 °C CuO is formed and from 900 °C to 1100 °C Cu2O appears.  Heating in air or oxygen yields CuSO4, CuSO3, and ultimately CuO (cupric oxide)

Properties
The infrared spectrum of Chevreul's salt contains strong bands with maxima at 473, 632 cm−1, medium ones at 915, 980, and 1025 cm−1, and a weak band at 860 cm−1. 980 cm−1 is due to symmetric stretch of the sulfite group, 632 cm−1 due to symmetric bend, 915 due to asymmetric stretch, and 473 cm−1 is due to asymmetric bend. The absence of splitting in these bands indicates that the sulfite group is not distorted by the other components in the compound.

The optical reflectance spectrum shows absorption around 425 nm with a shoulder to 500 nm.  This is due to a cuprous sulfite chromophore. An absorption peaking at 785 nm with a shoulder to 1000 nm, in the near infrared, is due to Jahn-Teller splitting in cupric ions. Maximum reflectance is around 650 nm in the red part of the spectrum.

In the infrared range the band gap is 0.85 eV.

Chevreul's salt is a representative member of an isomorphic series of double salts with formulae Cu2SO3•FeSO3•2H2O, Cu2SO3•MnSO3•2H2O, and Cu2SO3•CdSO3•2H2O. The properties of these salts show the effect of ionic radius and ion hardness. Another analogue, Cu2SO3•NiSO3•2H2O, is brick-red in colour. It is made by bubbling sulfur dioxide through a nickel sulfate, copper sulfate mixed solution, heating to 80°C and changing pH to 3.5 to precipitate the salt.

The thermal conductivity of Chevreul’s salt is 0.1 kWcm−1K−1. Heat capacity is 0.62 Jcm−3K−1, and thermal diffusivity is 0.154 cm2s−1.

The specific susceptibility is 3.71×10−6 emu/g.

In Chevreul's salt crystals there are two environments for copper.  The +1 oxidation state copper is in a distorted tetrahedral space surrounded by three oxygens and a sulfur atom. The +2 oxidation state copper (or other metal in the isomorphic series) is in a distorted octahedral coordination surrounded by four oxygen atoms and two water molecules.

The X-ray photoelectron spectrum of Chevreul's salt shows peaks at 955.6, 935.8, 953.3 and 943.9 eV that correspond to Cu(II) 2p1/2, 2p3/2,  Cu(I) 2p1/2, 2p3/2. There are also secondary peaks for copper at 963.7, and 943.9 eV. Sulfur 2p causes a peak at 166.7 eV and oxygen 1s causes a spike at 531.8.

Application
Chevreul's salt is used in a hydrometallurgical process to extract copper from ore. Firstly the ore is oxidised, then extracted with an ammonium sulfate-ammonia solution.  This is then injected with sulfur dioxide resulting in the precipitation of Chevreul's salt. pH must be between 2 and 4.5 for the precipitation to take place.

Chevreul's salt is formed as a corrosion product on copper metal in the presence of humid air contaminated with sulfur dioxide. When first formed the salt has an unstable orthorhombic form with a = 5.591, b = 7.781 and c = 8.356 Å, which changes to the normal monoclinic form over a month, or faster when heated.

References 

Copper compounds
Sulfites